Waterbug or water bug can refer to any of several things:

True bugs
 The true water bugs (Nepomorpha), including such insects as giant water bugs, creeping water bugs and backswimmers
 Various other aquatic true bugs, known collectively as water bugs
 Heteroptera

Cockroaches
 The American cockroach, Periplaneta americana
 The German cockroach, Blattella germanica
 The Oriental cockroach, Blatta orientalis

Giant Water Bug
 Belostomatidae

See also
 Waterbug Records, a record label

Animal common name disambiguation pages